WJTK (96.5 FM, "The Jet") is a News Talk Information–formatted radio station licensed to Columbia City, Florida, United States, and primarily serving the Lake City area. The station is owned by Fred Dockins, through licensee Dockins Broadcast Group, LLC, as part of a triopoly with Lake City–licensed classic rock station WGRO (960 AM) and Watertown–licensed country music station WQLC (102.1 FM). WJTK maintains transmitter facilities located off of County Road 242 southwest of Lake City. The station airs news programming from Townhall.

External links
 

JTK
News and talk radio stations in the United States